The New Caledonia Super Ligue 2018 is the 45th season of top-tier Caledonian football. It was originally scheduled to start on 31 March 2018, but was postponed to 7 April 2018. Twelve teams take part in the championship.

Standings
Note: 4 points for a win, 2 points for a draw, 1 point for a defeat.

See also
2018 New Caledonia Cup

References

New Caledonia Super Ligue seasons
New
2018 in New Caledonian sport